Ledumadumana is a village in Botswana, located about  northwest of Gaborone, the capital of Botswana.

References

Gaborone
South-East District (Botswana)
Populated places in Botswana
Villages in Botswana